FC Epfendorf 1929 e.V. is a German sports club based in Epfendorf, Baden-Württemberg. The team currently plays in the Kreisliga A, the ninth tier of the German football league system.

History
FC Epfendorf 1929 was officially founded on 2 May 1929 at the Gasthaus Engel in Epfendorf. The club played its first match on 22 September of that year, a 6–2 victory over SV Durchhausen.

Recent seasons

Key

Sources:

References

External links
Official Website
Official Facebook

Football clubs in Germany
Football clubs in Baden-Württemberg
1929 establishments in Germany
Association football clubs established in 1929
Multi-sport clubs in Germany